Yeon Gaesomun is a 2006 South Korean historical television series, starring Lee Tae-gon in titular role. It also featured Hwang In-young, Lee Jung-gil and Son Tae-young. Directed by Lee Jong Han, the series follows the life of Yeon Gaesomun, a powerful military dictator in the waning days of the Goguryeo kingdom. It premiered on June 1, 2006, on SBS and broadcast for 100-episodes on Saturday and Sunday at 20:45 (KST) till June 17, 2007. The budget of the series was 40 billion South Korean won.

Synopsis
Yeon Gaesomun was a general and powerful military dictator. In the chaotic period of 642, he killed the king of Goguryeo, Yeongnyu and installed Yeongnyu's nephew Bojang as his stooge on the throne. His efforts in calming down Yeon's two sons were not that successful. Then he started repressing Buddhism, the official religion of Goguryeo in favour of Taoism.

Cast
Yoo Dong-geun as Yeon Gaesomun 
Lee Tae-gon as young Yeon Gaesomun
Eun Won-jae as child Yeon Gaesomun
Na Han-il as Ohn Sa Moon
Hwang In-young as Yeon So Jung
Kim Kap-soo as Emperor Yang of Sui
Lee Jung-gil as Eul Ji Mun Duk
Won Goo Yun as Joui Seonin
Son Tae-young as Hong Bol Hwa
Park Si-yeon as Cheon Gwan Nyeo
Yoon Seung-won as Kim Yoo Shin
Lee Jong-soo as young Kim Yoo Shin
Lee David as child Kim Yoo Shin
Seo In-seok as Emperor Taizong of Tang
Lee Joo-hyeon as young Lee Shimin (later Emperor Taizong of Tang)
Ahn Jae-mo as Yeon Nam Saeng
Lee So-won as Hong Mae
Lee Hyo-jung as Young Yang Je (King)
Lee Jae-eun as Soo Yang Je's mistress
 Park In-hwan as Yeon Gaesomun's father
Choi Jong-hwan as Young Ryu Tae (later Yeongnyu of Goguryeo)
Choi Kyu-hwan as Saeng Hae
Yoo Tae-woong as Seol In Gwi
Jung Wook as Yang Liang
Park Chul-ho
Baek Seung-hyeon as King Munmu of Silla
Choi Jae-sung as Lee Mil
Choi Jung-woo as Li Jiancheng
Shin Dong-hun as Yang Manchun
Maeng Ho-rim as Wee Jing
Park Young-ji as Bang Hyun Ryung
Park Yoon-bae as Bae Goo
Kim Ki-bok as Kim Heum Soon (Yoo Shin's younger brother) (older adult)
Lee Kyun as Kim Heum Soon (young adult)
Lee Kyung-hwa as Queen Sobi (Soo Yang Je's wife)
Yoon Chul Hyung as Woomun Hwa Geub
Seo Kap-sook as Princess Mi Shil
Jung Ui-kap as Sul Tal
Jung Heung-chae as Gyebaek
Moon Hoe-won as King Uija of Baekje
Jo Sang-goo as Jook Ri
Lee Chang as General Jo Sam Hyang
Lee Se-eun as Go So Yeon
Ban Min-jung as So Sook Bi
Jun Hyun-ah as Empress Wang
Im Byung-ki as Lee Sa Ma
Kim Hong-pyo as Yeon Namgeon
Hong Soon-chang as Shim Sook Ahn
Sun Dong-hyuk as Bang Hyo Tae
Im Chae-hong as Lee Wongil
Hwang Geum-hee as Ui Ji-nyeo
Yang Hyun-min
Lee Jin-ah
Lee Il-woong
Kim Myung-jin
Song Seung-yong
Maeng Bong-hak
Kim Jung-hak
Lee Seung-ki
Kim Seung-gi
Seo Ho-chul
Kim Jong-kook
Baek In-chul

Notes

References

Seoul Broadcasting System television dramas
2006 South Korean television series debuts
2007 South Korean television series endings
Korean-language television shows
Television series set in the Sui dynasty
Television series set in the Tang dynasty
Television series by DSP Media
Television series set in Silla
Television series set in Goguryeo
South Korean historical television series
Television shows set in Pyongyang